Catherine Hickland (born February 11, 1956) is an American film, stage, and television actress, as well as a singer, author and cosmetics-company CEO and hypnotist. She began her career in television in 1978, appearing in guest roles on several series before being cast in a recurring role on Texas from 1980 to 1981. She also had supporting roles in the comedy film The Last Married Couple in America (1980), and the horror films Ghost Town (1988) and Witchery (1988).

In 1995, Hickland appeared as Fantine in a Broadway production of Les Misérables. From 1998 to 2008, she appeared in the U.S. soap opera One Life to Live, playing the character of Lindsay Rappaport, reprising the role again in 2009 and 2012. Hickland is also the CEO of Cat Cosmetics, her own cosmetics line that she started in 2001.

Early life 
Hickland was born and raised in Fort Lauderdale, Florida, to Arthur and Mary Hickland; her father was a dentist, and her mother a dental ceramist. She has one brother and one sister. Hickland graduated from Fort Lauderdale High School in 1974. She enrolled at Florida Atlantic University, but dropped out after two years to take a job as a flight attendant for National Airlines. After six months, she made a commercial for the airline and left for Los Angeles to study acting.

Career 
Hickland played in a number of daytime dramas. Her first major role was on Texas as Dr. Courtney Marshall from 1980 to 1981, followed by the role of Julie Clegg McCandless on Capitol from 1984 to 1987, and the dual role of Jenny Diamond from 1985 to 1986.

While engaged to her future husband David Hasselhoff, she played a role in his series Knight Rider as Stephanie "Stevie" Mason, who, in the story, was engaged to Michael Knight (Hasselhoff's character). She appeared in three episodes: "White Bird" (March 4, 1983), "Let It Be Me" (May 13, 1984), and "The Scent of Roses" (January 3, 1986). In 1985, Hickland appeared in 15 episodes of the game show "Body Language. She also appears on the debut David Hasselhoff record Night Rocker, singing on "Our First Night Together" and "Let It Be Me".

In 1987, she filled in for Katherine Kelly Lang as Brooke Logan on the serial The Bold and the Beautiful, while Lang was sick. She also played Tess Wilder on Loving (1993–1995) and The City (1995–1997). From 1998 to 2009, Hickland portrayed Lindsay Rappaport on One Life to Live, reprising her role towards the end of the show's run in 2012.

As a guest star, Hickland appeared in numerous television series, including CHiPs (1983), Airwolf (1985), and Law & Order and Law & Order: Criminal Intent (2001–2005).

Hickland also appeared on Broadway in the musical Les Misérables as Fantine in 1995. Also she performed live, singing with the National Symphony de Lyon in Lyon, France, in 1995. In 2001, she released a music CD, Sincerely Broadway, and that same year started a cosmetics line, Cat Cosmetics, for which she serves as CEO. She has also written a column on cosmetics and skin care for Soap Opera Digest.

Hickland's first book, The 30 Day Heartbreak Cure - A Guide to Getting Over Him and Back Out There One Month From Today was published in December 2008 by Simon & Schuster. Her second book, released in December 2014, is titled Cat & Fern's Excellent God Adventure: Daily Inspirations for 365 Days of Heaven On Earth, written with Fern Underwood and Lindsay Harrison.

Since 2008, Hickland has been operating as a hypnotist.

Personal life 
Hickland's first marriage was to Richard Ernest Knowlton on October 10, 1981, in Fort Lauderdale, Florida. They divorced on March 23, 1982. From March 24, 1984, to March 1, 1989, she was married to David Hasselhoff. On June 27, 1992, Hickland married All My Children star Michael E. Knight, with whom she lived in Manhattan until their divorce in 2006. After that marriage ended, Hickland married producer Todd Fisher on December 22, 2012. The couple have a home in Las Vegas and a ranch in California.

Hickland identifies as a Christian.

Filmography

Film

Television

Stage credits

References

Notes

Sources

Florida, Marriage Indexes, 1822-1875 and 1927-2001 [database on-line]

External links 

 

1956 births
Actresses from Fort Lauderdale, Florida
Actresses from Los Angeles
Actresses from New York City
American cosmetics businesspeople
American women singers
American film actresses
American soap opera actresses
American stage actresses
American television actresses
American women business executives
American women company founders
American company founders
Businesspeople from Florida
Cosmetics people
Florida Atlantic University alumni
Fort Lauderdale High School alumni
Living people
Musicians from Fort Lauderdale, Florida
20th-century American actresses
21st-century American actresses
21st-century American businesspeople
21st-century American businesswomen